Ordinances are laws that are promulgated by the President of India on the recommendation of the Union Cabinet, which will have the same effect as an Act of Parliament. They can only be issued when Parliament is not  in session. They enable the Indian government to take immediate legislative action. Ordinances cease to operate either if Parliament does not approve of them within six weeks of reassembly, or if disapproving resolutions are passed by both Houses. It is also compulsory for a session of Parliament to be held within six months. A total of 679 ordinances have been issued from 1950-2014.

List of Central Government Ordinances since 2003

List of state government ordinances 
Uttar Pradesh Recovery of Damages to Public and Private Property Ordinance, 2020

References

Law of India
Government of India
Parliament of India
India law-related lists